Hanna Romanazzi do Vale (born April 4, 1996) is a Brazilian actress and model.

Biography
Romanazzi was born on April 4, 1996 in Niterói is a municipality of the state of Rio de Janeiro. At the age of 5 she was already working as a model and at the age of 10 she took to the stage staging plays. 

Her debut on TV was in Globo's soap opera A Favorita, giving life to Camila, daughter of Zé Bob and Rita, roles of Carmo Dalla Vecchia and Christine Fernandes. Between 2009 and 2010, the actress played Rita in the morning series Ger@l.com.

In 2011, Hanna joined the cast of the remake O Astro, shown at eleven o'clock on TV Globo. The following year, she played Sofia in the 21st season of Malhação. Then, she participated in the first phase of the telenovela Alto Astral (2014) as Kitty, later played by Maitê Proença. In Babilônia she participated in the role of Cecília.

In 2015, she was invited to participate in Babilônia as Cecília, a pretty, well-resolved girl with a dubious character, who is willing to shake up Laís and Rafael's romance. In 2016, Hanna acted in the miniseries Ligações Perigosas, where she played Sofia, a student at a religious school and Cecília's best friend. Later, she joined the cast of Liberdade, Liberdade, in which she played Gironda, one of the girls from Cabaré de Virgínia, madam and ex-prostitute played by Lília Cabral.

Personal life
In 2016, after meeting actor Daniel Rangel at the Trupe Cena workshop held at Rede Globo, they started dating. The relationship came to an end in November 2019.

Filmography

References

External links

1996 births
Living people
People from Niterói
Brazilian people of Italian descent
Brazilian television actresses
Brazilian female models
20th-century Brazilian actresses
21st-century Brazilian actresses